Operation Boris was a British plan for military intervention in Zanzibar following the 1964 revolution.  It was devised around 20 February to be used if the radical left-wing Umma Party attempted to take power.  It replaced the earlier sea-based Operation Parthenon with a parachute assault launched from Kenya.  However the operation was not required and was jeopardised by the lack of co-operation from the Kenyan government and populace for an attack on Zanzibar.  Boris was replaced by Operation Finery, an amphibious helicopter assault, on 9 April 1964.

Objectives 
Operation Boris was intended as an intervention to be implemented if the radical left-wing Umma Party attempted to seize control of the Revolutionary Council from President Abeid Karume's more moderate Afro-Shirazi Party.  The British believed that this could be accomplished if the Umma Party gained the support of John Okello, leader of the recent revolution and Field Marshal of country's military forces. Operation Boris was designed as a replacement for, Operation Parthenon, an earlier plan that would depend on a force of Royal Navy vessels acting as the start point for an assault.  Boris had been devised around 20 February 1964, when the British government was informed that communist bloc troops may have helped to train the Zanzibar revolutionaries and that a new mix of troops would be better suited to an assault.

Plan 
The British had identified Unguja, Zanzibar's southern island, as the main base of revolutionary power, whilst Pemba, to the north, was less affected.  Thus Operation Boris would commence with a parachute assault on Unguja's airfield, launched from pre-existing British airfields in Kenya, with troops securing Unguja before repeating the tactic on Pemba.  However the success of Boris was not assured as it was recognised by the planners that any unilateral intervention by Britain against Zanzibar would cause a "strong adverse reaction" in Kenya.  Britain had previously informed Kenya, Uganda and Tanganyika that if they requested British intervention in Zanzibar then it would be forthcoming but no such requests were received.  Furthermore, the Kenyan government had stated that its clearance for British troops to move freely in Kenya did not extend to any intervention in Zanzibar.  In any case the security of British forces in Kenya could not be guaranteed if there was local opposition to the intervention and Zanzibari forces would likely be informed of any impending attack by sympathetic Kenyans.  With this in mind the Defence Council replaced Boris on 9 April with Operation Finery, an amphibious helicopter assault.

References

Bibliography 
.
.

History of Zanzibar
Boris
1964 in military history
1964 in Zanzibar